Taikatalvi may refer to:
Moominland Midwinter, the fifth book in Tove Jansson's Moomins series of books
"Taikatalvi", the thirteenth episode of the first season of Finnish animated TV series Moominvalley
"Taikatalvi", a 2011 song by Nightwish from Imaginaerum